Dory Elizabeth Reeves (born 1957) is a New Zealand planning academic. As of 2018 she is a full professor at the University of Auckland.

Academic career
After a 1990 PhD titled  'An examination of building for sale under licence as a low cost home ownerhsip [sic] tool.'  at the University of Sheffield,  Reeves worked in the public sector, higher education and private practice in the UK before moving to the University of Auckland in 2008, rising to full professor.

In 2017 Reeves was elected a Fellow of the Royal Town Planning Institute in the UK.

Selected works
 Reeves, Dory. Planning for diversity: Policy and planning in a world of difference. Routledge, 2004.
 Buckingham, Susan, Dory Reeves, and Anna Batchelor. "Wasting women: The environmental justice of including women in municipal waste management." Local Environment 10, no. 4 (2005): 427-444.
 Reeves, Dory. "Mainstreaming gender equality: an examination of the gender sensitivity of strategic planning in Great Britain." Town Planning Review 73, no. 2 (2002): 197-214.
 Higgins, Marilyn, and Dory Reeves. "Creative thinking in planning: How do we climb outside the box?." Town Planning Review 77, no. 2 (2006): 221-244.

References

External links
 
 

New Zealand women academics
Living people
1957 births
New Zealand urban planners
Academic staff of the University of Auckland
Alumni of the University of Sheffield
Date of birth missing (living people)
Place of birth missing (living people)